Changchengopterus is a genus of non-pterodactyloid pterosaur from Qinglong County in Hebei Province, China.

The fossil specimen, holotype CYGB-0036, of the type and only species, Changchengopterus pani, was found in the Tiaojishan Formation dating from the Callovian and named and described by Lü Junchang in 2009. The generic name combines the Changcheng, the Great Wall of China, with a Latinised Greek pteron, "wing". The specific name honours Pan Lijun, who collected the fossil and donated it to science. The holotype, a skeleton lacking the skull, represents a young juvenile, of which the combined paired wing elements measure just seventeen centimetres.  In 2011, a second specimen was described, PMOL-AP00010, acquired in 2008 by the Paleontological Museum of Liaoning. It consists of a skeleton with lower jaws, of an adult individual.

The wingspan of the referred specimen was in 2011 estimated at seventy centimetres.

In his original description, Lü's phylogenetic analysis concluded that Changchengopterus was a primitive pterosaur closely related to the earlier European pterosaur Dorygnathus, and he placed it in Rhamphorhynchidae. However, a subsequent study by Wang and colleagues (2010) noted some similarities with the wukongopterids, and they tentatively placed it in that family. Andres & Myers (2013) found it to be outside Wukongopteridae and slightly more closely related to the pterodactyloids within the larger group Monofenestrata.

See also
 List of pterosaur genera
 Timeline of pterosaur research

References

Late Jurassic pterosaurs of Asia
Monofenestratans
Fossil taxa described in 2009
Taxa named by Lü Junchang